Hill End is a former gold mining town in New South Wales, Australia. The town is located in the Bathurst Regional Council local Government area.

History 
What is now Hill End was originally a part of the Tambaroora area: Tambaroora town was a few kilometres to the north of present-day Hill End. In the 1850s the Hill End area was known as Bald Hills. In 1860 a village was proclaimed, first as Forbes, then in 1862 it was altered to Hill End. Tambaroora had been the larger centre; in 1865, it had seven public houses to Hill End's two. Following the discovery of rich gold reefs at Hawkins Hill (Hill End), in the early 1870s. Hill End overtook Tambaroora as the main town in the area.

Gold rush 

Hill End owes its existence to the New South Wales gold rush of the 1850s, and at its peak in the early 1870s it had a population estimated at 8,000 served by two newspapers, five banks, eight churches and twenty-eight pubs.

The town's decline when the gold gave out was dramatic: by 1945 the population was 700. The photographer Beaufoy Merlin recorded daily life in the town at its peak; his photographs can be found in the town museum/visitor information centre. The glass plate negatives are held in the State Library of New South Wales.

Development
In October 1862 the Telegraph line reached Hill End (Tambaroora) from Bathurst via Sofala, the Telegraph Office opened for telegraph messages bringing the remote town into instant contact with the rest of the Colony. Prior to this event communications took 12 hours by the mail stagecoach to Bathurst.

After delays due to lack of materials a telephone line was installed into Hill End in 1914; after 60 years of Morse code telegraph messages Hill End could now speak to adjacent towns and even Sydney if necessary.

In 1923 a telephone exchange was installed at the Hill End Post Office; before this calls could only be made from the Post Office to other towns. The exchange allowed new telephones installed in businesses and private homes to connect locally and to other towns.

Hill End artists colony 
In the late 1940s Hill End was discovered by artists Russell Drysdale, who painted possibly his best-known work, The cricketers there, and Donald Friend, and it quickly became an artists' colony. Other artists who worked there included Jean Bellette. Today, the Hill End artist-in-residence program aims to ensure the continuity of this connection.

Heritage listings 
Hill End has a number of heritage-listed sites, including:
 Hill End Historic Site
 Golden Gully: Golden Gully and Archway
 10 km North: Quartz Roasting Pits Complex

Hill End and Tambaroora family history research 
The Hill End & Tambaroora Gathering Group has been in existence since the 1930s. Their goal is to provide information on the life, the families and events of a bygone era and to connect their worldwide community of descendants who have an affiliation to the district. Their website contains transcriptions of many primary records, listing names of the early miners and pioneers, that may not appear in the more mainstream family history resources.

Hill End today 

Hill End is classified as a historical site by the National Parks and Wildlife Service (NPWS). However, it is still home to a handful of residents operating the local pub, general store, cake store and antique store. The NPWS runs a museum just off the main road which contains many original photos and items of equipment from the busy days of the gold rush. A more extensive museum, the privately owned History Hill, is located a few kilometres from the town on the Bathurst Road.

NPWS has installed signs around the town to give visitors an idea of what was once in place on the now empty lots of land. Currently only a handful of buildings remain in their original form. However, most of those buildings still serve the purpose they did back during the gold rush. Access to the town's lookouts is via gravel roads. A walking track in the town leads to a mine and other ruins.

The most popular tourist activity in Hill End is gold panning with some of the older members of the community running gold panning tours in the same fossicking areas that yielded the gold which brought on the gold rush. Metal detectors or gold panning are not allowed within the historic site; however, there is a fossicking area just past the cemetery off the Mudgee Road.

The Royal Hotel and the local "bed and breakfasts" offer accommodation and there are a number of camping options within the town limits.

Bridle Track 

The Bridle Track runs from Duramana (north of Bathurst) directly to the town centre of Hill End. Generally the track can be classified as an easy 4WD track. The Bridle Track begins as a narrow tar-covered road; however, it later changes to dirt. Much of the last   is single lane. Part of the Bridle Track is currently closed, after a rockfall has rendered it impassible at  Monaghan's Bluff.

Access 

Camping 
The National Parks and Wildlife Service provides several camping sites.

Notable people
 Selina Sarah Elizabeth Anderson (1878–1964), parliamentary candidate.
 Colin Simpson (1908-1983), Australian journalist, author and traveller spent most of his childhood in Hill End where his aunt and uncle ran the Royal Hotel.

See also 
 Australian gold rushes
 Gold mining

References

External links 

 Hill End: Artists In Residence Program
 SMH Tourist Guide
 The Hill End & Tambaroora Gathering Group

 
Hill End, Australia, History of
Towns in New South Wales
Ghost towns in New South Wales
Towns in the Central West (New South Wales)
1860 establishments in Australia
Mining towns in New South Wales